Joseph Harold Hodgetts (2 June 1916 – 2008) was an English professional footballer who played in the Football League for Mansfield Town.

References

1916 births
2008 deaths
English footballers
Association football forwards
English Football League players
Brighton & Hove Albion F.C. players
Mansfield Town F.C. players